The 1913–14 season saw Rochdale compete in The FA Cup for the 6th time and reached the 4th qualifying round. The also competed in the Central League and finished 10th.

Statistics
												
												

|}

Competitions

Central League

F.A. Cup

Lancashire Senior Cup

Manchester Senior Cup

Friendlies

References

Rochdale A.F.C. seasons
Rochdale